Bill Istvan Günther Skarsgård (born 9 August 1990) is a Swedish actor, producer, director, writer, voice actor, and model. He is best known for portraying Pennywise the Dancing Clown in the supernatural horror films It (2017) and It Chapter Two (2019), based on Stephen King's novel of the same name.

Skarsgård has also appeared in the comedy Simple Simon (2010), the dystopian thriller The Divergent Series: Allegiant (2016), the espionage thriller Atomic Blonde (2017), the comedy-horror Villains (2019), the drama Nine Days (2020), the Marvel Cinematic Universe film Eternals (2021) and the horror film Barbarian (2022). He starred in the supernatural horror series Hemlock Grove (2013–2015) and the anthology horror series Castle Rock (2018–2019). He played the lead role in the Netflix series Clark (2022).

Early life
Skarsgård was born on 9 August 1990 in Vällingby, Sweden, the son of actor Stellan Skarsgård and doctor My Skarsgård. He has seven siblings: Alexander, Gustaf, Valter (all actors), as well as Sam, Eija, Ossian, and Kolbjörn. Ossian and Kolbjörn are half-brothers from Stellan Skarsgård's remarriage to Megan Everett.

Career
In 2011, Skarsgård was nominated for a Guldbagge Award for his leading role as Simon in Simple Simon. At the age of 21, he won the European Film Academy's Shooting Stars Award in 2012. Beginning in 2013, Skarsgård played the role of Roman Godfrey in the Netflix original Hemlock Grove.

In April 2014, Skarsgård featured on the cover of Hero – a bi-annual men's fashion and culture magazine, shot by Hedi Slimane. In the issue, he is interviewed by his father.

Skarsgård played Matthew in the science fiction thriller The Divergent Series: Allegiant (2016), his first major American film. He played horror villain Pennywise the Dancing Clown in the 2017 film It and reprised the role in the 2019 sequel.

Skarsgård was a series regular on 2018's Castle Rock, as a young man with an unusual legal problem. That same year, he portrayed Zeitgeist in Deadpool 2. In 2020, he played Mateo in episode 4 of AMC's anthology series Soulmates. In 2021, he voiced the main antagonist Kro in Eternals.

In the 2022 Netflix miniseries Clark, Skarsgård portrayed Clark Olofsson, the notorious Swedish criminal whose involvement in the Norrmalmstorg robbery gave rise to the term Stockholm syndrome.

Skarsgård will play an undisclosed role in John Wick: Chapter 4. He is set to lead the reboot of The Crow directed by Rupert Sanders. He has been cast as Count Orlok in the upcoming remake of Nosferatu.

Personal life
Skarsgård is in a relationship with actress Alida Morberg. In October 2018, their daughter was born.

Filmography

Film

Television

Awards and nominations

References

External links

1990 births
Living people
21st-century Swedish male actors
Male actors from Stockholm
Bill
Swedish male child actors
Swedish male film actors
Swedish male television actors
Swedish male voice actors